Lee Ah-jin (born  February 4, 1991) is a South Korean actress, and model. She is best known for her leading roles in Assorted Gems (2009) and Death Bell 2 (2010).

Career 
Ah-jin began her activities in 2003 with the television program.

In 2008 she starred in her first television film Get Up with Lee Min-ho, and movie A Light Sleep as Yeol Lin.
In 2009 she received an award for young Korean stars.

In 2014 she moderated Baseball Tournament at Suwon, Gyeonggi-do.

Filmography

Television

Music video appearances

Awards
2009 - The 2nd Korea Junior Star Awards Movie Rookie Division.

References

South Korean television actresses
South Korean film actresses
South Korean female models
1991 births
Living people
People from Daegu